Kasti Landscape Conservation Area is a nature park situated in Saare County, Estonia.

Its area is 500 ha.

The protected area was designated in 2000 to protect landscapes and biodiversity of Southern Saaremaa.

References

Nature reserves in Estonia
Geography of Saare County